M. L. Brackett (July 4, 1933 – June 30, 2015) was an American football player who played for the Chicago Bears and New York Giants. He played college football at the Auburn University, having previously attended Etowah High School.

References

1933 births
2015 deaths
American football defensive ends
Auburn Tigers football players
Chicago Bears players
New York Giants players
Players of American football from Alabama
People from Etowah County, Alabama